Khalid Anwar is an Indian politician who is serving as a Member of the Bihar Legislative Council since 23 June 2018 representing the Janata Dal (United) when 11 candidates were elected unopposed.

References

Living people
Members of the Bihar Legislative Council
Janata Dal (United) politicians
Year of birth missing (living people)